Lex and Rory is a 1994 Australian film from director Dean Murphy.

References

External links

Lex and Rory at Oz Movies

Australian comedy films
1990s English-language films
1994 films
1994 comedy films
1990s Australian films